Ernst Gottfried Baldinger (13 May 1738 – 21 January 1804), German physician, was born in Großvargula near Erfurt.

He studied medicine at Erfurt, Halle and Jena, earning his MD in 1760 under the guidance of Ernst Anton Nicolai and in 1761 was entrusted with the superintendence of the military hospitals connected with the Prussian encampment near Torgau.

He published a treatise in 1765, De Militum Morbis, which met with a favourable reception. In 1768, he became professor of medicine at Jena, which he left in 1773 for Göttingen, and in 1785 he moved to Marburg, where he died of apoplexy on 21 January 1804.

Among his pupils were Johann Friedrich Blumenbach, Samuel Thomas von Sömmerring, Albrecht Thaer, and Johann Christian Wiegleb. He wrote approximately 84 separate treatises, in addition to numerous papers scattered through various collections and journals. He corresponded with Swedish botanist Carl Linnaeus and was the author of some plant names.  He was the editor of  Auszüge aus den neuesten Dissertationen über die Naturlehre, Arzneiwissenschaft und alle Theile derselben

Works
partial list
1769-1778 Pallas, P. S.,  Erxleben, J. C. P., Baldinger, E. G.  [full title] Peter Simon Pallas Naturgeschichte merkwuerdiger Thiere, in welcher vornehmlich neue und unbekannte Thierarten durch Kupferstiche, Beschreibungen und Erklaerungen erlaeutert werden. Durch den Verfasser verteutscht. I. Band 1 bis 10te Sammlung mit Kupfern. Berlin und Stralsund, G. A. Lange (Samml. 1-10), 48 Taf.
1783-1785 Historia mercurii et mercurialium medica (Volume 1/2) Digital edition by the University and State Library Düsseldorf

References

Bibliography

External links
 Gaedike, R.; Groll, E. K. & Taeger, A. 2012: Bibliography of the entomological literature from the beginning until 1863 : online database - version 1.0 - Senckenberg Deutsches Entomologisches Institut.

1738 births
1804 deaths
Physicians from Erfurt
University of Erfurt alumni
University of Halle alumni
University of Jena alumni
Academic staff of the University of Göttingen
Academic staff of the University of Marburg
18th-century German physicians
18th-century German botanists
German entomologists
Scientists from Erfurt